Steve Ogden (born 21 September 1950) is a businessman from Bryan, Texas, who is a former Republican member of the Texas Senate representing the 5th District. Ogden became a state senator in January 1997. He chaired Texas Senate Finance Committee. He has a Bachelor of Science degree from the United States Naval Academy in Annapolis, Maryland, and a Master of Business Administration degree from Texas A&M University in College Station.

Business
Ogden has been in the oil and gas exploration business for more than two decades. He is president of Ogden Resources, an independent oil and gas company based in Bryan. Prior to entering the oil business, Ogden served for nine years as an officer in the U.S. Navy's nuclear submarine force.

Before his election to the Texas Senate, Ogden served three terms in the Texas House of Representatives.

Recognition

As a state senator, Ogden was honored by the Texas County Judges and Commissioners Association, the Texas Association of District and County Attorneys, Scott & White, The Texas A&M University System, the Texas Veterans Commission, the Texas Municipal Police Association, and the Free Market Committee.   Ogden received the sixth annual Bob Bullock Award for Outstanding Public Stewardship and was awarded the 2004 Defensor Pacem medal by Sam Houston State University in Huntsville.  Following the 79th regular session of the Texas Legislature in 2005, he was named one of the "Ten Best Legislators" by Texas Monthly magazine, a "Top Legislator" by Capital Inside, and "Pro-Life Chairman of the Year" by Texas Right to Life.

Personal

Steve and Beverly Ogden were married in December 1973 and live in Bryan. They are the parents of four children.  Michael, a LtCol in the United States Marine Corps, and his wife Lisa are the parents of Gabriel and Canon Ogden. Stephanie and her husband William Lewis have two sons, Christopher and Will. Kristen, a graduate of the University of Texas at Austin, and her husband Cameron have two children. The youngest son is Charles Benedict Ogden.

Election history

Most recent election

2006

Previous elections

2002

1998

1997

1996

1994

1992

References

External links
Senate of Texas - Senator Steve Ogden official TX Senate website
Project Vote Smart - Senator Steve Ogden (TX) profile
Follow the Money - Steve Ogden
2006 2004 2002 1998 campaign contributions

1950 births
Living people
Republican Party Texas state senators
Presidents pro tempore of the Texas Senate
Republican Party members of the Texas House of Representatives
Texas A&M University alumni
People from Bryan, Texas
21st-century American politicians